John James Kirby (1 July 1889 – 11 March 1939) was an Australian rules footballer who played with Essendon in the Victorian Football League (VFL).

Kirby was a small forward and is the earliest known player to have kicked a goal with his first kick in the VFL, scored in 1911; this achievement would not be made again for nine years, when Gordon Coventry, an AFL Legend of the Australian Football Hall of Fame replicated the feat in 1920. Kirby had a good start to his career from a team point of view as well, not experiencing a loss until his 15th game. Kirby topped Essendon's goalkicking table in 1912, with 43 goals, and again the following season when he kicked 29 goals. He was a member of Essendon's premiership teams in 1911 and 1912.

References

External links

Essendon past player profile

1889 births
Australian rules footballers from Melbourne
Essendon Football Club players
Essendon Football Club Premiership players
1939 deaths
Two-time VFL/AFL Premiership players
People from South Melbourne